Glenageary railway station serves Glenageary in Dún Laoghaire–Rathdown, Ireland.

It is beside 'The Metals' (na Ráillí), a walking and cycling route that runs to Dún Laoghaire station.

History
The station opened on 1 November 1867, and was electrified in 1983 with the arrival of DART services.

See also 
 List of railway stations in Ireland

References

External links
 Irish Rail Glenageary Station Website

Iarnród Éireann stations in Dún Laoghaire–Rathdown
Railway stations opened in 1867
1867 establishments in Ireland
Railway stations in the Republic of Ireland opened in the 19th century